Avijit 'Munna' Mitra (born 6 July 1953) is an India-born English clergyman, educator and former first-class cricketer.

Mitra was born in West Bengal at Bhowanipore in July 1953. Moving to England as a child, he was educated in Birmingham at King Edward's School, before going up to Keble College, Oxford. While studying at Oxford, he played first-class cricket for Oxford University in 1974 and 1975, making six appearances. He scored 157 runs in his six matches, at an average of 13.08 and a high score of 30.

After graduating from Oxford, Mitra became a schoolmaster at King Edward's School, Birmingham. He left in July 1981 to teach at Highgate School. Mitra also took holy orders in the Church of England, featuring regularly in the Church Times Cricket Cup. From 1988 to 1996, he taught classics at Abingdon School, where he was also a housemaster and a cricket coach, before moving to the Bluecoat School. He was head of boarding at King's School, Rochester before becoming associate priest at Hempstead. Mitra still teaches part-time at Rochester Grammar School for Girls, in addition to being a priest-vicar at Rochester Cathedral.

References

External links

1953 births
Living people
People from Kolkata
Indian emigrants to England
People educated at King Edward's School, Birmingham
Alumni of Keble College, Oxford
English cricketers
Oxford University cricketers
Schoolteachers from London
20th-century English Anglican priests
21st-century English Anglican priests
Schoolteachers from Kent
Schoolteachers from the West Midlands
Staff of Abingdon School